"Hole In My Heart" is a single by Luke Friend. The song was released on 29 March 2015 in the United Kingdom. The song has peaked at number 40 on the UK Singles Chart.

Music video
A music video to accompany the release of "Hole in My Heart" was first released onto YouTube on 8 February 2015 at a total length of three minutes and twenty-five seconds.

Track listing
Digital download
 "Hole in My Heart" - 3:05

Remixes
 "Hole in My Heart" (Acoustic Version) - 3:01
 "Hole in My Heart" (Wideboys Club Remix) - 3:59
 "Love & War" (Acoustic) - 3:28

Charts

Release history

References

2015 debut singles
2014 songs
RCA Records singles
Songs written by Roy Stride
Songs written by Jon Maguire